Live at Carnegie Hall is the fourth live album by American singer Liza Minnelli. It was recorded at Carnegie Hall, New York City in September 1979 and released in 1981. 

The live show was one of the eleven sold-out shows, the longest guest appearance that an artist ever held in Carnegie Hall. The album cover was made by the artist Andy Warhol. 

At that time of the release she was unaffiliated with a major label, and had the foresight to record these concerts herself. Two years later, in 1981, she began selling the limited edition double album at her live dates. 

In 2021, record label Real Gone Music the album was titled Live In New York 1979 and re-released as a limited pressed pink vinyl and also as a red vinyl limited to a 1400 copies each one. In 2022, the album was finally released in a 3-CD edition which includes the completely show for the first time and the abridged version that was released in the vinyls format.

The album received favorable revies from The Wall Street Journal and BroadwayWorld websites.

Track listing

Personnel
Arranged by Bill Byers, Michael Abene, Ralph Burns
Conducted by Bill Lavorgna
Recorded by David Hewitt on the Record Plant NY Black Truck
Produced by Hank Cattaneo & Bill Lavorgna
Musicians
Victor Paz - trumpet
Ross Konikoff - trumpet
Harry DeVito - trombone
Arnie Lawrence - alto saxophone
Lawrence Feldman - tenor saxophone
Kenny Berger - baritone saxophone
Bill LaVorgna - drummer, conductor
Jay Leonhart - bass
Rick Leowes - guitar
Dave Cox - percussion
Steve Tubin - keyboards
Pat Rebillot - piano

References

Liza Minnelli live albums
1981 live albums
Albums arranged by Ralph Burns
Albums recorded at Carnegie Hall